The Arnett Independent School District is a school district based in Arnett, Oklahoma United States. It contains an elementary school and a combined middle/high school.

See also
List of school districts in Oklahoma

References

External links
 Arnett Overview

School districts in Oklahoma
Education in Ellis County, Oklahoma